Lunar most commonly means "of or relating to the Moon".

Lunar may also refer to:

Arts and entertainment
 Lunar (series), a series of video games
 "Lunar" (song), by David Guetta
 "Lunar", a song by Priestess from the 2009 album Prior to the Fire
 Lunars, a fictional race in the series The Lunar Chronicles by Marissa Meyer

Other uses
 Lunar Magic, Super Mario World level editor
 Lunar Design, or LUNAR, a San Francisco-based design consultancy
 Hasselblad Lunar, a digital camera
 Lunar, a brandname of Ethinylestradiol/cyproterone acetate, a birth control pill
 Lunar C (Jake Brook, born 1990), English rapper
 LUNAR (software) (1970–1972), question-answering system by Bill Woods (computer scientist)

See also
 
 
 Lunar calendar, based upon the monthly cycles of the Moon's phase
 Lunar day, in such calendars
 Lunar month, in such calendars
 Moon (disambiguation)
 Luna (disambiguation)